Pilsko is the second highest mountain, in the Żywiec Beskids (Oravské Beskydy in Slovakia) mountain range, on the border between Poland and Slovakia. It is a hiking destination in summer and a skiing area in winter. The name Pilsko is frequently used not only to describe the main peak, which lies in Slovakia, but also whole range. The mountain lies not only on the border between the two nations, it also marks the European Watershed.

Origins of the name of Pilsko are not known, it might have been named after an 18th-century owner of local meadows, named Piela. There are several other theories, scholar A. Siemionow claims that Pilsko is a distorted, Slovak version of the word Poland. What is known is that the name first appears in documents from 1721, in a book “Historia Naturalis Curiosa Regni Poloniae”, written by Reverend Gabriel Rzaczynski (who also was first reported man to climb the mountain).

Upper part of Pilsko is flat and made of limestone, covered by grass and mountain pine. On Slovak side there is a field altar, founded by residents of the Orava village of Mutne. Every year in July, a parish priest from Mutne comes here for a service. On northeastern slope, along yellow tourist trail, there is a cross, commemorating one of the first victims of the 1939 Invasion of Poland, a Border Defence Corps Corporal, Franciszek Basik.

In 1967, the government of Czechoslovakia created a nature reserve in Slovak side of Pilsko, with the area of 809 hectares. Polish nature reserve, created in 1971, is much smaller, as it covers only 15.4 hectares. The peak provides views of the Western Beskids, the Tatras, and sometimes eastern slopes of the Sudetes. Two skiing centers operate on slopes in the area of Korbielow: Skiing Center Pilsko in Korbielow, and Kolej Baba in Korbielow-Kamienna. In the 1990s, more than 10 hectares of forests were cleared for construction of ski trails, which resulted in protests of ecological organizations both from Poland, and former Czechoslovakia. Influx of tourists resulted in a 1980 tragedy, when a group of athletes with their coach got lost, and four young men died of hypothermia. Pilsko has a PTTK shelter, located at the height of 1,270 meters, near which there is a junction of tourist trails.

References

Mountains of Poland
Mountains of Slovakia
Mountains of the Western Carpathians
Landforms of Silesian Voivodeship
Poland–Slovakia border
International mountains of Europe